Asansol Polytechnic, is a government polytechnic located in Asansol, Paschim Bardhaman district, West Bengal. This polytechnic is affiliated to the West Bengal State Council of Technical Education,  and recognised by AICTE, New Delhi. This polytechnic offers diploma courses in Electrical, Mining, Metallurgical, Mining Surveying, Mechanical and Civil Engineering.

This is the first government polytechnic institute in Asansol and second is Kanyapur Polytechnic. The college is named as per its location as it is situated at South Dhadka. The college is very close to Asansol Junction railway station , Asansol North Police Station and Asansol City Bus Stand. There are two hostels in the college - one for all departments and one for mining. The main motto of the institution is to create quality engineers. This institution is known for its friendly relationship between teachers and students.

References

External links
 Admission to Polytechnics in West Bengal for Academic Session 2006-2007
https://sites.google.com/site/asansolgovtpolytechnic/
https://collegewiki.in/asansol-polytechnic/

Universities and colleges in Paschim Bardhaman district
Technical universities and colleges in West Bengal
Educational institutions established in 1957
1957 establishments in West Bengal